Alexandra "Xie" Rhoda Kitchin (29 September 1864 – 6 April 1925) was a notable 'child-friend' and favourite photographic subject of Charles Lutwidge Dodgson (Lewis Carroll).

She was the daughter of Rev. George William Kitchin (1827–1912), who was Dodgson's colleague at Christ Church, Oxford, and later became Dean of Winchester and Dean of Durham, and his wife, Alice Maud Taylor, second daughter of Bridges Taylor, the British consul in Denmark at the time. Her godmother was Alexandra of Denmark, then Princess of Wales, who had been a childhood friend of her mother.  Xie had three younger brothers: George Herbert, Hugh Bridges, and Brook Taylor, and a younger sister, Dorothy Maud Mary.  All were featured in Dodgson's photographs.

Dodgson photographed her around fifty times, from age four until just before her sixteenth birthday.  The works they made together, often in tableau form, are commonly known to collectors, curators, and the contemporary artists who are inspired by them as the 'Xie' (pronounced 'Ecksy' — a diminutive form of Alexandra) pictures.

It is commonly reported that Carroll once posed the question “How do you achieve excellence in photography?” and then provided this answer: “Put Xie in front of a Lens.” In truth, in a letter to her on June 16, 1880, he writes, "Here is a riddle—'What is the best way to secure Excellence in a photograph?' Answer: 'First you take a "lence," and then put "ecce" before it.'" He is punning on "ecce," the Latin word for "behold."

She married Arthur Cardew, a civil servant and gifted amateur musician, on 17 April 1890.  They had six children: Penelope (b. 1891), Christopher (b. 1894), Richard (1898–1918), Michael (1901–1983), Philip (b. 1903) and Arthur (b. 1906).  The family resided at 4 North View, Wimbledon Common, London, until Xie's death; they also had a country home at Saunton. She is buried at Putney Vale Cemetery.

Unlike Alice Liddell, Isa Bowman and other Dodgson 'child-friends', Xie never published reminiscences of him.

In popular culture 
 Subject of the play Xie by Justin Sherin.

Gallery

References

External links
Sotheby's (London) Auction — Lewis Carroll photograph of Xie Kitchin, 1870, up for auction November 12, 2007.
Christopher Cardew; Richard Cardew; Michael Cardew; Philip Cardew 1906 photograph at the National Portrait Gallery

1864 births
1925 deaths
People from Oxford
English female models
Lewis Carroll
Burials at Putney Vale Cemetery